The Combination routine competition of the 2016 European Aquatics Championships was held on 12 May 2016.

Results
The final was held at 16:00.

References

Synchronised swimming